Misgomyces is a genus of fungi in the family Laboulbeniaceae. The genus contain 4 species.

Species 
 Misgomyces annae T. Majewski 1973 
 Misgomyces dyschirii Thaxt. 1900 
 Misgomyces flexus T. Majewski 1973 
 Misgomyces heteroceri Maire 1920 
 Misgomyces ptenidii Scheloske 1969 (also as Siemaszkoa ptenidii)
 Misgomyces trichopterophilus  (Thaxt.) Thaxt. 1931

References

External links
Misgomyces at Index Fungorum

Laboulbeniomycetes